Hakea scoparia is a species of flowering plant in the family Proteaceae and is endemic to the south-west of Western Australia where it grows in shrubland. It is a shrub with ascending branches, terete leaves and clusters of cream to pinkish flowers in leaf axils from June to September.

Description
The inflorescence consists of 50-70  pinkish-cream coloured flowers that appear in clusters in the leaf axils. The branchlets are densely covered in short, soft matted hairs or short, soft silky hairs at flowering time. Sometimes sparsely smooth without hairs. The leaves grow alternately and have 5 longitudinal veins along their length. The fruit grow in groups of 1-8 per axil on a short stalk.

Taxonomy and naming
Hakea scoparia was first formally described in 1845 by the Swiss botanist Carl Meissner in Plantae Preissianae. His description was based on plant material collected from the environs of the Swan River by James Drummond. The specific epithet (scoparia)  is derived from the Latin word scopa meaning "broom" a reference to the foliage.

Distribution and habitat
Hakea scoparia is a widespread species mainly across the wheatbelt region of Western Australia, from south of Northampton to Dumbleyung and extending in the east to Yilgarn. Grows in heath and scrubland in yellow sand over laterite, gravel, sandy-clay and loam.  A frost tolerant ornamental species preferring a sunny aspect.

Conservation status
Hakea scoparia is classified as "not threatened" by the Western Australian Government Department of Parks and Wildlife.

References

scoparia
Eudicots of Western Australia
Plants described in 1845
Taxa named by Carl Meissner